This is a list of notable dishes found in Russian cuisine. Russian cuisine is a collection of the different cooking traditions of the Russian Empire. The cuisine is diverse, with Northeast European/Baltic, Caucasian, Central Asian, Siberian, East Asian and Middle Eastern influences. Russian cuisine derives its varied character from the vast and multi-ethnic expanse of Russia.

Russian dishes

Zakuski

Soups

Salads

Meat dishes

Pancakes

Bread

Pirogi (pies)

Sauces

Desserts

Beverages

Non-alcoholic drinks

Alcoholic drinks

See also

 Khrushchev dough
 Mikoyan cutlet
 List of Russian desserts
 List of Russian restaurants
 Russian candy

References

Bibliography
 

Lists of foods by nationality

Dishes
Russian cookbooks